Rogério Dutra Silva was the defending champion but lost in the first round to Evan Song.

Carlos Berlocq won the title after defeating Blaž Rola 6–2, 6–0 in the final.

Seeds

Draw

Finals

Top half

Bottom half

References
Main Draw
Qualifying Draw

Visit Panamá Cup - Singles
2018 Singles